The 1999–2000 FIS Ski Jumping World Cup was the 21st World Cup season in ski jumping and the 10th official World Cup season in ski flying. It began in Kuopio, Finland on 27 November 1999 and finished in Planica, Slovenia on 19 March 2000. The individual World Cup was won by Martin Schmitt and the Nations Cup by Finland.

Lower competitive circuits this season included the Grand Prix and Continental Cup.

Map of world cup hosts 
All 18 locations which have been hosting world cup events for men this season.

 Four Hills Tournament
 Nordic Tournament

Calendar

Men

Men's team

Standings

Overall

Ski Jumping (JP) Cup

Ski Flying

Nations Cup

Four Hills Tournament

Nordic Tournament

References 

World cup
World cup
FIS Ski Jumping World Cup